Jan-Frederik Uys (born 3 January 1994 in Potchefstroom, South Africa) is a South African rugby union player, currently playing with Italian team, . His regular position is lock.

Career

Youth and Varsity Cup rugby

He attended and played high school rugby for Paul Roos Gymnasium in Stellenbosch. This led to his selection in the Western Province side that played at the Under-16 Grant Khomo Week in Upington in 2010. This, in turn, earned him an inclusion in a South African Under-16 High Performance squad that attended a training camp in Cape Town. In 2011, Uys represented the Western Province Under-18 side that played at the Academy Week tournament.

He joined the Western Province Rugby Institute after high school and captained the  team that played in the 2013 Under-19 Provincial Championship.

After a stint playing Vodacom Cup rugby (see below, Uys played a big part in the  side's 2014 Under-21 Provincial Championship campaign. He made eight appearances during the season to help them finish top of the log and subsequently reach the final of the tournament. He played in the final, but could not prevent his side losing the final 20–10 to the s on home soil.

Western Province

Uys made his first class debut during the 2014 Vodacom Cup competition. He started 's opening match of the season, a 16–8 victory over near-neighbours . He made five consecutive starts for Western Province at the start of the competition and played off the bench in the final two matches of the group stages of the competition.

Eastern Province Kings

He made eleven appearances for the Under-21 team during the 2015 Under-21 Provincial Championship Group A and also captained the side on occasion,.

Pau

At the beginning of 2016, he left Port Elizabeth and moved to France, where he joined Top 14 side  for the 2015–16 season.

Brive

He spent 6 months in Pau before moving to fellow Top 14 side  for the 2016–17 season. He is currently still with Brive for the 2017-2018 season

Honours
 Currie Cup winner 2020–21
 Pro14 Rainbow Cup runner-up 2021

References

1994 births
Living people
Blue Bulls players
Bulls (rugby union) players
CA Brive players
FC Grenoble players
Rugby union locks
Rugby union players from Potchefstroom
South African rugby union players
Western Province (rugby union) players
Zebre Parma players